The Christian F. Weinrich House is a historic house at 217 Opdyke Street in Chester, Illinois. The house was built circa 1873 by Christian F. Weinrich, a local merchant who lived in the house with his family until his death in 1913. Weinrich designed the house using elements of the Folk Victorian and Gothic Revival styles. The house's Folk Victorian features include its gable front plan with a side gable and the stickwork on the front-facing gable. While many of its Gothic Revival elements are also Folk Victorian elements, such as its steep roof and decorative wooden porch, its intersecting gables are a characteristic feature of the style.

The house was added to the National Register of Historic Places on June 20, 2018.

References

National Register of Historic Places in Randolph County, Illinois
Houses on the National Register of Historic Places in Illinois
Victorian architecture in Illinois
Gothic Revival architecture in Illinois
Houses completed in 1873